The Roman Catholic Diocese of Chachapoyas  is a diocese located in the city of Chachapoyas in the Ecclesiastical province of Piura in Peru.

History
28 May 1803: Established as Diocese of Maynas from the Diocese of Cuenca in Ecuador, Metropolitan Archdiocese of Lima and Diocese of Trujillo
2 June 1843: Renamed as Diocese of Chachapoyas

Bishops

Ordinaries, in reverse chronological order
 Bishops of Chachapoyas (Roman rite), below
 Bishop Humberto Tapia Díaz (2022.03.09 – ...)
 Bishop Emiliano Antonio Cisneros Martínez, O.A.R. (2002.03.27 – 2022.03.09)
 Bishop José Ignacio Alemany Grau, C.SS.R. (1995.08.17 – 2000.05.18)
 Bishop Ángel Francisco Simón Piorno (1991.05.18 – 1995.03.18), appointed Bishop of Cajamarca
 Bishop Antonio de Hornedo Correa, S.J. (1977.07.09 – 1991.05.18)
 Bishop Manuel Prado Perez-Rosas, S.J. (1970.09.07 – 1976.12.29), appointed Archbishop of Trujillo
 Bishop José Germán Benavides Morriberón (1958.08.28 – 1968.11.30)
 Bishop Ottavio Ortiz Arrieta, S.D.B. (1921.11.21 – 1958.03.01)
 Bishop Emilio Francisco Lisson Chaves, C.M. (1909.03.16 – 1918.02.25), appointed Archbishop of Lima
 Bishop José Santiago Irala, O.F.M. (1904.06.04 – 1909)
 Bishop Francesco Solano del Rísco, O.F.M.  (1865.03.27 – 1905)
 Bishop Pedro Ruiz (1853–1863)
 Bishops of Maynas (Roman rite), below
 Bishop José María Amaga (1838–1849)
 Bishop Hipólito Antonio Sánchez Rangel de Fayas, O.F.M. (1805.06.26 – 1824.09.28), appointed Apostolic Administrator of Cartagena (en España)

Auxiliary bishop
Otoniel Alcedo Culquicóndor, S.D.B. (1953-1958), appointed Bishop of Ayacucho o Huamanga (Guamanga)

See also
Roman Catholicism in Peru

Sources
 GCatholic.org
 Catholic Hierarchy

Roman Catholic dioceses in Peru
Roman Catholic Ecclesiastical Province of Piura
Religious organizations established in 1803
Roman Catholic dioceses and prelatures established in the 19th century
1803 establishments in the Viceroyalty of Peru